Dhumkkudiya (2019) is an Indian, Nagpuri film directed by Nandlal Nayak and produced by Dr Sumit Agarwal (NCKS EXPLORATIONS). The film features Rinkal Kacchap and Pradhuman Nayak in prominent roles. The story of the film is based on true incidents of human trafficking. The film won Outstanding Achievement Award in Culcutta International Cult Film Festival (2019). It has won Best Editing and Best Content awards in Japan Film Festival. It has won Best Feature Film in Hollywood Blood Horror Festival, Los Angeles in 2019 and Best Producer, Best Acting Ensemble, Best Costume, Best Makeup & Hairstyling, Best Trailer and Best Poster Awards in 2020. It has won Best Lead Actress Award in American Golden Picture International Film Festival and in New York Movie Awards 2020 both in USA. The film has won more than 60 awards around the world. The film will be screened in Cannes Film festival of France on 12 July 2021.

Plot
The film is based on true incident of human trafficking of a 14 years old tribal girl from Jharkhand who died.

Cast

Rinkal Kachhap as Rishu
Pradhuman Nayak as Budhwa
Rajesh Jais as Minister
Nikhhil R Khera as Minister's son in law 
Subrat Dutta as Kamal
Vinod Anand as Mill Owner
Varsha Rittu Lakra as Minister's daughter
Gita Guha as Rishu's Mother
Chandra Shekhar Dutta as Agent

Awards
2019: Outstanding Achievement Award, Culcutta International Cult Film Festival, Kolkata, India
2019: Best Editing and Best Content Awards, Japan Film Festival, Tokyo, Japan
2019: Best Director, Eurasia International Film Festival, Berlin & Moscow
2019: Best Feature Film, Hollywood Blood Horror Festival, Los Angeles, USA
2019: Finalist, Florence Film Awards, Florence, Italy
2019: Finalist, Care Awards, Cairo, WV, USA
2019: Screened In Unheard India Section, Kolkata International Film Festival, Kolkata, India
2019: Closing Film, Azamgarh International Film Festival, Azamgarh, India
2019: Official Selection Screening in The 25th Kolkata International Film Festival, Kolkata, India
2019: Best Script Award, Chhatrapati Shivaji International Film Festival, Pune, India
2020: Critic's Choice Award, Best Hindi Film, Rajasthan International Film Festival 2020, Jaipur, India
2020: Critic's Choice Award, Best Actor, Rajasthan International Film Festival 2020, Jaipur, India
2020: Best Lead Actress, American Golden Picture International Film Festival, USA
2020: Best Producer Award, Hollywood Blood Horror Festival, USA
2020: Best Acting Ensemble, Hollywood Blood Horror Festival, USA
2020: Best Costume Design, Hollywood Blood Horror Festival, USA
2020: Best Makeup & Hairstyling, Hollywood Blood Horror Festival, USA
2020: Best Trailer, Hollywood Blood Horror Festival, USA
2020: Best Poster, Hollywood Blood Horror Festival, USA
2020: Best Actress, New York Movie Awards, USA
2020: Best Screenwriter, American Golden Picture International Film Festival, USA
2020: Best Trailer, American Golden Picture International Film Festival, USA
2020: Best Editor, American Golden Picture International Film Festival, USA
2020: Best Sound Design, American Golden Picture International Film Festival, USA
2020: Best Director, American Golden Picture International Film Festival, USA
2020: Best Director, Mabig Film Festival, Augsburg, Germany
2020: Best Drama Film, Mabig Film Festival, Augsburg, Germany
2020: Best Script, Hollywood International Golden Age, New York, USA
2020: Official Selection, IAFF - International Art Film Festival, London, UK
2020: Official Selection, Asian Film Festival, Los Angeles, Hollywood, USA
2020: Best Script, Aasha International Film Festival, Nashik, India
2020: Semi Finalist, Cannes International Independent Film Festival, Cannes, France
2020: Semi Finalist, South Asian Film Festival On Montreal, Canada, USA
2020: Official Selection, Great Lakes International Film Festival, Erie, PA, USA
2020: Best Feature Drama, Indie-Dance Film Festival, New York, USA
2020: Finalist, Wales International Film Festival, Wales, UK
2020: Best Feature Film Drama, Sicily Independent Film Awards, Sicily, Italy
2020: Official Selection, First Coast Film Festival, Jacksonville, Florida, USA
2020: Finalist, Vesuvius International Film Festival, Italy
2020: Official Selection, Love Wins Film Festival, New York, USA
2020: Finalist, Freedom Festival International, Columbia, USA
2020: Best Feature Film, Madras Independent Film Festival, Chennai, India
2020: Best Actress, Madras Independent Film Festival, Chennai, India
2020: Runner Up Best First Filmmaker Award, The 2nd Annual NEWSFEST International Film Festival & Awards, Las Vegas, USA
2020: Official Selection, The NewsFest (True Stories), USA
2020: Official Selection, Caorle Film Festival, Caorle, Italy
2020: Silver Winner, Queen Palm International Film Festival, Palm Spring, California, USA
2020: Finalist, Anatolia International Film Festival, Istanbul, Turkey
2020: Finalist, Kosice International Film Festival, Kosice, Russia
2020: Official Selection, Mumbai International Cult Film Festival, Mumbai, India
2020: Official Selection, Golden Jury International Film Festival, Mumbai, India
2020: Official Selection, Sincine Film Awards, Mumbai, India
2021: Semi Finalist, 5th Jaipur Film World 2021, Jaipur, India

References

External links

Nagpuri
Nagpuri-language films